Rasheed Bailey (born July 29, 1993) is a professional gridiron football wide receiver for the Winnipeg Blue Bombers of the Canadian Football League (CFL). He played college football at Delaware Valley. He has been a member of the Philadelphia Eagles, Jacksonville Jaguars, San Diego Chargers and Cleveland Browns of the National Football League (NFL) and the BC Lions of the Canadian Football League (CFL), although he was never active for a regular-season game.

College career
Bailey finished his four-year career at Delaware Valley University as the school's all-time leader in receiving yards (3,138) and ranked second and third in receiving touchdowns (29) and receptions (165), respectively. As a senior in 2014, capped his career by setting single-season school records in all major receiving categories with 80 catches for 1,707 yards and 19 touchdowns. Led all of Division III in receiving yardage, yards per game (155.2) and receiving TDs. Bailey  was also college teammates with current Spokane Empire quarterback Aaron Wilmer

Professional career

Philadelphia Eagles
After going undrafted during the 2015 NFL Draft, Bailey signed as an undrafted free agent with the Philadelphia Eagles. Bailey was cut by the Eagles on September 4, 2015

BC Lions 
On October 6, 2015, Bailey was signed to the BC Lions practice roster, but was subsequently removed and signed with the Jacksonville Jaguars.

Jacksonville Jaguars 
On October 20, 2015, Bailey signed to the Jacksonville Jaguars practice squad. He was released on August 17, 2016.

San Diego Chargers
On August 18, 2016, Bailey was claimed off waivers after being released by the Jaguars. On September 3, 2016, he was waived/injured by the Chargers. On September 9, he was released from injured reserve.

Philadelphia Eagles
On January 4, 2017, Bailey signed a reserve/future contract with the Eagles. He was waived by the Eagles on May 10, 2017.

Cleveland Browns
On August 5, 2017, Bailey signed with the Cleveland Browns. He was waived on September 1, 2017, during roster cutdowns.

Carolina Panthers
On December 12, 2017, Bailey was signed to the Carolina Panthers' practice squad. He signed a reserve/future contract with the Panthers on January 8, 2018. On August 31, 2018, Bailey was released as part of final roster cuts.

Winnipeg Blue Bombers
Bailey joined the Winnipeg Blue Bombers in 2019, his first season in the Canadian Football League. He finished the year with 19 receptions for 206 yards. Bailey also helped the team as they fought their way into the 2019 Grey Cup, winning both playoff games on the road. He had two receptions for 15 yards as the club won their first Grey Cup in 30 years. Bailey signed a one-year contract extension with the Winnipeg Blue Bombers on January 14, 2021. During the 2021 season he had an increasing role in the Bombers' offence, helping the team lead the CFL on the offensive side of the ball. He had 52 catches for 629 yards both placed in the CFL's top 14, and had 5 touchdown passes as well. Bailey also picked up 58 yards on seven rushes.

Bailey was asked about joining the Blue Bombers by media from his hometown Philadelphia in 2021 and he replied of playing for the team that "You think about Winnipeg and you say, ‘Where is Winnipeg?’ or some people might ask ‘What is the CFL?’ But the moment I got here, I knew this is a football town. The crowd, the bells that ring, the horn, the cannon that goes off when we score touchdowns ... everything about it is just special." Bailey continued to play a key role on the Bombers in his sophomore season, helping the team to their second consecutive Grey Cup. There the Blue Bombers played against the hometown Hamilton Tiger-Cats again in a rematch. Bailey had a critical catch for 34 yards and caught the two-point conversion after the touchdown in overtime as the Blue Bombers won the 108th Grey Cup by a score of 33-25. He finished the game with three catches for 60 yards.

After testing free agency, it was announced on February 17, 2023, that Bailey had signed a one-year contract with the Blue Bombers.

Statistics

References

External links
 Winnipeg Blue Bombers bio
 Delaware Valley Aggies football bio

1993 births
Living people
Players of American football from Philadelphia
Players of Canadian football from Philadelphia
American football wide receivers
Canadian football wide receivers
American players of Canadian football
Delaware Valley Aggies football players
Philadelphia Eagles players
BC Lions players
Jacksonville Jaguars players
San Diego Chargers players
Cleveland Browns players
Carolina Panthers players
Winnipeg Blue Bombers players